Gilbert Merle is a Puerto Rican radio announcer who reached the height of his popularity in the "El Meneo de la mañana" morning show. Gilbert graduated from the Interamerican University In San Germán, Puerto Rico (US).
As Shanom's long standing radio partner, Gilbert Merle became a radio icon in the media. (Shanom and Gilbert are household names to the westerners of the island.) Gilbert Merle was part of the first team to have aired a morning show from Puerto Rico to the US mainland.

References
nueva enciclopedia de medios, 2005

Interamerican University of Puerto Rico alumni
Puerto Rican radio personalities
Living people
Year of birth missing (living people)